Temple of Anahita may refer to:

 Temple of Anahita, Istakhr, Iran
 Temple of Anahita, Kangavar, Iran